Godfried Ako -Nai(born September 21, 1954) is a Ghanaian Politician and a member of the Third Parliament of the Fourth Republic representing the Dade-Kotopon Constituency in the Greater Accra Region of Ghana.

Early life and education 
Ako was born on  21 September 1954 in Dade-Kotopon in the Greater Accra Region of Ghana.

Politics 
Ako was first elected into Parliament on the Ticket of the New Patriotic Party during the December 2000 Ghanaian General Elections as a member of Parliament for the Dade-Kotopon Constituency in the Greater Accra Region of Ghana. He polled 32,637 votes out of the 61,824 valid votes cast representing 52.80%. He lost in the 2004 Parliamentary Primaries to Laryea Abednego.

Career 
Ako is a Lawyer and a Former Member of Parliament for the Dade-Kotopon Constituency in the Greater Accra region of Ghana from 2001 to 2005.

References 

Living people
1954 births
People from Greater Accra Region
New Patriotic Party politicians
Ghanaian MPs 2001–2005